Bhrukuteswar Shiva Temple is situated in Yamesvara Patna, Old Town, Bhubaneswar in Odisha, India. It is a single structure pidha deul without any frontal porch. According to the local people this temple was built by the Kesaris (Somavamsis).

Location 
i) Address & ii) Approach: Bhrukutesvar Shiva Temple is situated in Yamesvara Patna, Old Town, Bhubaneswar. It is located in the right side of Badheibank Chowk on the road leading form Lingaraja temple to Yamesvara Temple. The temple is facing towards north. It is a single structure pidha deul without any frontal porch. The enshrined deity is a Shiva linga in with a circular yonipitha.

Ownership 
i) Single/ Multiple Multiple
ii) Public/ Private: Public
iii) Any other (specify) Since it is a living temple. The local people look after the
monument.

Age 
i) Precise date: Late 13th Century.
ii) Approximate date: Ganga period

Property Type 
i) Precinct/ Building/ Structure/Landscape/Site/Tank: Structure
ii) Subtype: Temple
iii) Typology: Pidha deul

Physical description 
i) Surrounding : Compound wall in south, east and west and an ancient well
in north.

ii) Orientation: The temple is facing towards north.

iii) Architectural features (Plan and Elevation): On plan, the temple has a square vimana.
On elevation, the vimana is a pidha deul measuring 5.03 m in height. With threefold
division of bada the temple measures 2.03 m in height. The gandi has three receding tiers
that measures 3.00 m in height and the mastaka has collapsed.

iv) Raha niche & parsva devatas: —
53

v) Decorative features: —
Doorjambs: The doorjambs measuring 1.70 m in height and 0.70 m in width are plain.
Lintel: —

vi) Building material: Laterite.

vii) Construction techniques: Dry masonry

viii) Style: Kalingan

See also
 List of temples in Bhubaneswar

Notes

References 
1. Lesser Known Monuments of Bhubaneswar by Dr. Sadasiba Pradhan
 
2. Debala Mitra, Bhubaneswar, New Delhi, 1958, P. 60.

3. L. S.S. O’ Malley, Bengal District Gazetter Puri, Calcutta 1908, P. 243.

4. M.M. Ganguly, Orissa and Her Remains, Calcutta, 1912, P. 269.

5. N. K. Sahu (Ed), A History of Orissa, Vol. II, Delhi, 1980, P. 270.

6. R. P. Mohapatra, Archaeology in Orissa, Vol.I, Delhi, 1986, P. 82.

7. R. L. Mitra. The Antiquities of Orissa, Vol. II, Calcutta, 1963, P. 118-121.

13th-century Hindu temples
Shiva temples in Odisha
Hindu temples in Bhubaneswar